The Play-offs of the 2011 Fed Cup Asia/Oceania Zone Group II were the final stages of the Group II Zonal Competition involving teams from Asia and Oceania. Using the positions determined in their pools, the eight teams faced off to determine their placing in the 2011 Fed Cup Asia/Oceania Zone Group II. The top team advanced to 2012 Fed Cup Asia/Oceania Zone Group I.

Promotional Round
The first placed teams of each pool played in a head-to-head round. The winner advanced to the 2011 Fed Cup Asia/Oceania Zone Group I for 2012.

Indonesia vs. Hong Kong

3rd to 4th play-off
The second placed teams of each pool played in a head-to-head round to find the third and fourth placed teams.

Philippines vs. Singapore

5th to 6th play-off
The third placed teams of each pool played in a head-to-head round to find the fifth and sixth placed teams.

Pakistan vs. Turkmenistan

7th to 8th play-off
The last placed teams of each pool played in a head-to-head round to find the seventh and eighth placed teams.

Kyrgyzstan vs. Oman

Final Placements

  advanced to the Fed Cup Asia/Oceania Zone Group I for 2012, but they placed last in their pool and thus was sent to the relegation play-offs. They lost, and therefore was relegated back to Group II for 2013.

See also
Fed Cup structure

References

External links
 Fed Cup website

2011 Fed Cup Asia/Oceania Zone